Premnaspirodiene oxygenase (HPO, Hyoscymus muticus premnaspirodiene oxygenase) is an enzyme with systematic name (-)-vetispiradiene,NADPH:oxygen 2alpha-oxidoreductase. This enzyme catalyses the following chemical reaction

 (-)-vetispiradiene + 2 NADPH + 2 H+ + 2 O2  solavetivone + 2 NADP+ + 3 H2O (overall reaction)
(1a) (-)-vetispiradiene + NADPH + H+ + O2  solavetivol + NADP+ + H2O
(1b) solavetivol + NADPH + H+ + O2  solavetivone + NADP+ + 2 H2O

Premnaspirodiene oxygenase heme-thiolate protein (P-450).

References

External links 
 

EC 1.14.13